Vitrea is a genus of small, air-breathing land snails, terrestrial pulmonate gastropod mollusks in the family Pristilomatidae.

According to the World Register of Marine Species this genus belongs in the family Zonitidae.

Species
This genus contains more than 60 species, including the following:

subgenus Vitrea Fitzinger, 1833
 Vitrea diaphana (Studer, 1820)
 Vitrea transsylvanica (Clessin, 1877)

subgenus Subrimatus A. J. Wagner, 1907
 Vitrea narbonensis (Clessin, 1877)
 Vitrea subrimata (Reinhardt, 1871)

subgenus Crystallus R. T. Lowe, 1854
 Vitrea contracta (Westerlund, 1871)
 Vitrea crystallina (O. F. Müller, 1774)

subgenus ?
 Vitrea contortula (Krynicki, 1837)
 Vitrea garganoensis (E. Gittenberger & Eikenboom, 2006) 
 Vitrea inae
 Vitrea nadejdae
 Vitrea pseudotrolli
 Vitrea pygmaea (Boettger, 1880)
 Vitrea striata
 Vitrea vereae Irikov, Georgiev & Riedel, 2004
 and many others

References

External links

 AnimalBase info at: 

Pristilomatidae
Taxonomy articles created by Polbot